Tom Gianas is an American comedy writer, director and producer.  Gianas was the showrunner for the MTV sketch comedy series Human Giant.  He has collaborated with and directed Bob Odenkirk in Half My Face is A Clown; Sarah Silverman in Jesus is Magic, which was adapted to Sarah Silverman: Jesus Is Magic; and Jack Black in Tenacious D.  Tom was also a writer and director on Saturday Night Live and Nick Swardson's Pretend Time on Comedy Central, which he co-created with Nick Swardson.

References

External links
 

Living people
American television directors
American television producers
American television writers
American male television writers
Year of birth missing (living people)